Events in the year 1964 in Japan. It corresponds to Shōwa 39 (昭和39年) in the Japanese calendar.

1964 is considered a seminal year in modern Japanese history. The Tokyo Olympics and first run of the bullet train reflected a society-wide sense that post-war reconstruction was over and that Japan had rejoined the international family of nations.  Diplomatic negotiations underway this year between South Korea and Japan resulted in a formal normalization of relations the following year.

Individuals born beginning around this date were often subsequently identified as "shinjinrui" (or new people) because they had not experienced the suffering older generations had during World War II or the post-war period, and on the contrary, grew up in material plenty.

Incumbents
Emperor: Hirohito
Prime Minister: Hayato Ikeda (L–Hiroshima, 3rd term) until November 9, Eisaku Satō (L–Yamaguchi)
Chief Cabinet Secretary: Yasumi Kurogane (L–Yamagata) until July 18, Zenkō Suzuki (L–Iwate) until November 9, Tomisaburō Hashimoto (L–Ibaraki)
 Chief Justice of the Supreme Court: Kisaburō Yokota
 President of the House of Representatives: Naka Funada (L–Tochigi)
 President of the House of Councillors: Yūzō Shigemune (L–national)
 Diet sessions: 46th (regular session opened in December 1963, to June 26), 47th (extraordinary, November 9 to December 18), 48th (regular, December 21 to 1965, June 1)

Governors
Aichi Prefecture: Mikine Kuwahara 
Akita Prefecture: Yūjirō Obata 
Aomori Prefecture: Shunkichi Takeuchi 
Chiba Prefecture: Taketo Tomonō 
Ehime Prefecture: Sadatake Hisamatsu 
Fukui Prefecture: Eizō Kita 
Fukuoka Prefecture: Taichi Uzaki
Fukushima Prefecture: Zenichiro Satō (until 23 March); Morie Kimura (starting 16 May)
Gifu Prefecture: Yukiyasu Matsuno 
Gunma Prefecture: Konroku Kanda 
Hiroshima Prefecture: Iduo Nagano 
Hokkaido: Kingo Machimura 
Hyogo Prefecture: Motohiko Kanai 
Ibaraki Prefecture: Nirō Iwakami 
Ishikawa Prefecture: Yōichi Nakanishi 
Iwate Prefecture: Tadashi Chida 
Kagawa Prefecture: Masanori Kaneko 
Kagoshima Prefecture: Katsushi Terazono 
Kanagawa Prefecture: Iwataro Uchiyama 
Kochi Prefecture: Masumi Mizobuchi 
Kumamoto Prefecture: Kōsaku Teramoto 
Kyoto Prefecture: Torazō Ninagawa 
Mie Prefecture: Satoru Tanaka 
Miyagi Prefecture: Yoshio Miura 
Miyazaki Prefecture: Hiroshi Kuroki 
Nagano Prefecture: Gon'ichirō Nishizawa 
Nagasaki Prefecture: Katsuya Sato 
Nara Prefecture: Ryozo Okuda 
Niigata Prefecture: Juichiro Tsukada
Oita Prefecture: Kaoru Kinoshita 
Okayama Prefecture: Yukiharu Miki (until 21 September); Takenori Kato (starting 15 November)
Osaka Prefecture: Gisen Satō 
Saga Prefecture: Sunao Ikeda 
Saitama Prefecture: Hiroshi Kurihara 
Shiga Prefecture: Kyujiro Taniguchi 
Shiname Prefecture: Choemon Tanabe 
Shizuoka Prefecture: Toshio Saitō 
Tochigi Prefecture: Nobuo Yokokawa 
Tokushima Prefecture: Kikutaro Hara 
Tokyo: Ryōtarō Azuma 
Tottori Prefecture: Jirō Ishiba 
Toyama Prefecture: Minoru Yoshida 
Wakayama Prefecture: Shinji Ono 
Yamagata Prefecture: Tōkichi Abiko 
Yamaguchi Prefecture: Masayuki Hashimoto 
Yamanashi Prefecture: Hisashi Amano

Events

March 18: Hayakawa Electric (the predecessor of today's Sharp) and Sony announce that they have completed a prototype electronic calculator using Japanese-manufactured diodes and transistors.
March 24: U.S. ambassador Edwin Reischauer is stabbed by a Japanese youth.
April 1: Japanese citizens are permitted to freely travel overseas.
April 12: Channel 12, the predecessor of TV Tokyo, begins operations.
 April 17 – Orient Lease, as predecessor of Orix Group founded in Osaka.
 April 29 - The Keiō Dōbutsuen Line opens.
June 16: An earthquake in Niigata Prefecture kills 12.
July 14: According to Japan Fire and Disaster Management Agency official confirmed report, a Katsushima Warehouse caught fire and explode in Shinagawa, Tokyo, total 19 person were human fatalities and 117 persons were wounded.
July 18: A heavy rain, following devastate flood and landslide in Shimane and Tottori Prefecture, at least 128 people lives. 
 August 18 – The International Olympic Committee bans South Africa from the Tokyo Olympics on the grounds that its teams are racially segregated.
September 17: The Tokyo Monorail begins operations.
October 1: The Tōkaidō Shinkansen begins operations.
October 10–24: 1964 Summer Olympics held in Tokyo. Judo introduced for the first time as an Olympic Game.
October 25: Ikeda Hayato resigns as prime minister; Eisaku Satō is elected to replace him.
November 9: Sato announces his first cabinet.
November 17: The political party Komeito is formed.
December 23: Tokyo Metro Tōzai Line was opened.

Births
January 1: Akemi Masuda, athlete
January 4: Riki Takeuchi, actor
January 25: Seiko Senou, actor of 1987 Metal Hero Series Choujinki Metalder.
March 8: Hiroshi Tsuburaya, actor of 1984 Space Sheriff Series Uchuu Keiji Shaider (d. 2001).
March 9: Tomomitsu Niimi, criminal (d. 2018)
March 12: Kaori Ekuni, author
March 18:
Mika Kanai, voice actress and singer
Yoko Kanno, pianist and songwriter
April 23: Rie Ishizuka, voice actress
April 30: Misa Watanabe, voice actress
May 5: Minami Takayama, singer and voice actress
May 6: Daisuke Araki, former professional baseball player  
May 31: Yukio Edano, politician
June 22: Hiroshi Abe, model and actor
June 23: Tomonohana Shinya, sumo wrestler and coach
July 3: Toshiharu Sakurai, voice actor 
July 7: Shinichi Tsutsumi, actor
July 9: Kazumi Kawai, actress (d. 1997)
July 14: Kippei Shiina, actor
July 19: Masahiko Kondō, solo singer of Johnny & Associates
July 24: Banana Yoshimoto, author
July 25: Reiko Takashima, actress
August 10: Hiro Takahashi, singer, lyricist, and composer (d. 2005)
September 13: Junko Mihara, politician, former singer, and actress
September 23: Koshi Inaba, singer of B'z
October 5:
Keiji Fujiwara, voice actor
Seiko Hashimoto, ice speed skater
Megumi Yokota, one of the North Korean abductee victims of the late 1970s (d. ca. 1977?)
October 12: Masaru Ogawa, figure skater
October 18: Etsuko Inoue, tennis player
October 20: Tomoko Yamaguchi, actress
October 24: Kotaro Tanaka, actor of 1991 Super Sentai Chōjin Sentai Jetman as Red Hawk/Ryu Tendou.
November 4: Yūko Mizutani, voice actress (d. 2016)
December 13: hide, musician (d. 1998)
December 15: Norihisa Tamura, politician
December 23: Kazuhiro Koshi, skeleton racer
December 28: Kaori Yamaguchi, judoka

Deaths
February 8: Boshirō Hosogaya, admiral (b. 1888)
February 17: Chūichi Hara, admiral (b. 1889)
April 5: Tatsuji Miyoshi, poet, literary critic, and editor (b. 1900)
May 6: Haruo Satō, novelist and poet (b. 1892)
May 8: Kichisaburo Nomura, politician and military leader (b. 1877)
August 17: Keiji Sada, actor (b. 1926)
November 29: Ryūsaku Tsunoda, educator and historian (b. 1877)

Statistics
Yen value: US$1 = ¥360 (fixed)

See also
 1964 in Japanese television
 List of Japanese films of 1964

References

 
Years of the 20th century in Japan
Japan
1960s in Japan